The 6th Separate Mechanized Brigade was a formation of the Ukrainian Ground Forces sent to Iraq in March 2004 to replace 5th Mechanized Brigade. Brigade was deployed from March 2004 to 22 September 2004.

Mission objectives

Maintain stability and safety in Wasit Governorate
Reconnaissance and destruction of terrorist and organized crime groups, detainment and court judgment of military criminals
Provide support for Coalition Provisional Authority in reconstruction of civil departments
Provide support together with other organizations in rebuilding of schooling, medical, electrical and water systems, industrial complexes, creation of new work places

Operations
Operation Iron Saber

Brigade Order of Battle
61st Separate Mechanized Battalion – BTR
62nd Separate Mechanized Battalion – BTR and cars
63rd Separate Mechanized Battalion – BRDM-2 and cars

Casualties

Killed

Wounded

References

Mechanised infantry brigades of Ukraine
Military units and formations established in 2004
Military units and formations disestablished in 2004
2004 in Iraq